The Battle of Cerignola was fought on 28 April 1503 between Spanish and French armies outside the town of Cerignola, Apulia, Kingdom of Naples (now in modern-day Italy), approximately  west of Bari. 
The Spanish force under the command of Gonzalo Fernández de Córdoba (El Gran Capitán) comprising 6,300 men, including 2,000 Landsknecht pikemen, 1,000 arquebusiers and 20 cannons, defeated the French force of 9,000 men, mainly gendarme heavy cavalry and Swiss mercenary pikemen, with about 40 cannons, led by Louis d'Armagnac, Duke of Nemours, who was killed during the battle.  It was one of the first European battles won by gunpowder weapons, as the attacks by the French cavalry and Swiss pikemen were shattered by the fire of Spanish arquebusiers behind a defensive ditch.

Preparations
The Third Italian War was re-kindled in late 1502, over disagreements stemming from the secret Treaty of Granada, signed on 11 November 1500. Although it was agreed that Louis XII of France would assume the throne of Naples, he and the monarchs of Spain soon quarreled over several territories between their respective spheres of control. 

The Spanish forces under Fernández de Córdoba avoided contact with the French at first, hoping to lure the French into complacency. After a series of skirmishes, the battle of Cerignola was the first major engagement in this phase of the war, alongside the second battle of Seminara in Calabria the week before.

Fernández de Córdoba was outnumbered but had the advantage of the terrain, with the Spanish occupying and fortifying the heights of Cerignola with ditches and stakes.

The Spanish infantry was organized into a new type of unit called coronelías, the immediate predecessor of the later tercios. They were armed with a mix of pikes, arquebuses, and swords. This type of formation had revolutionized the Spanish army, which like the French, had centered on cavalry well into the 15th century, in the battles of the Reconquista against the Muslims in Spain.

In front of the hillside, a ditch was dug behind which the arquebusiers took their positions, with the Landsknecht pikemen behind them. The Spanish artillery was placed on top of the hill among the vineyards, having a good view of the entire battlefield. The Spanish light cavalry jinetes screened the front of the position, while the Spanish heavy cavalry under the Italian condottiero Prospero Colonna were kept in reserve.

The Spanish troops faced a professional French army based on the Ordonnance reforms, relying on the heavy armoured cavalry of the Compagnies d'ordonnance and mercenary Swiss pikemen. This army also had more artillery than the Spanish, but the French artillery would not arrive in time to take an active part in the battle.

The battle
The battle began with two charges by the French heavy cavalry against the centre of the Spanish army, but these were both repulsed by intense Spanish artillery and arquebus fire. The next assault tried to force the Spanish right flank, but many of the French cavalrymen fell into the Spanish ditch and the attack was again thrown back by a storm of fire from the Spanish arquebusiers. One of those killed by the arquebus volleys was Nemours, making him possibly the first European general killed in action by small-arms fire. With the Swiss commander, Chandieu, taking charge, the Swiss pikemen attacked with the cavalry instead of waiting for the arrival of the French rearguard and artillery under Yves d'Alègre. Seeing the imminent French infantry assault upon his center, Córdoba withdrew the arquebusiers to the flanks and the Landsknecht pikemen took their place behind the ditch.  The Swiss formations, joined by the Gascon infantry, were unable to break into the defensive positions. Held by the Landsknechts in the front, fired into their flanks by the arquebusiers and harassed by the Spanish light cavalry, the Swiss and French were again driven back with heavy casualties, including Chandieu.

Fernández de Córdoba then launched a counterattack by the Spanish and German infantry and the reserve of heavy Spanish cavalry. Mounted arquebusiers surrounded and routed the remaining French gendarmes, but the Swiss pikemen managed to retreat in a relatively organized fashion.

Upon witnessing the defeat of both the gendarmes and the Swiss, d'Alègre directed a withdrawal. He was pursued by the victorious Spanish jinetes.

"..what happened in the battle of Chirinola {Cerignola}; where an Italian, believing the Spanish were beaten, threw fire in the powder wagons, and the army being confused by such an accident, El Gran Capitan was encouraged saying 'good sign friends, those are the lights of victory' and thus it was."

Aftermath
The severe French defeat cost them around 4,000 soldiers, with Spanish losses amounting to some 500 men. The French supply wagons and artillery was captured by the victorious Spanish troops. The end of the battle saw the first time a "call to prayer" (toque de oracion) was issued, a practice that was later adopted by most Western armies, when the Great Captain, upon seeing the fields full of French bodies (who, like the Spaniards, were Christian), ordered three long tones to be played and his troops to pray for all the fallen.

After the battle the defeated French army retreated to the fortress of Gaeta north of Naples. De Córdoba's forces attempted to storm the fortress, but the attacks all failed. The besieged French were prepared for a long siege and were receiving supplies by sea. Thus unable to take Gaeta and fearing the arrival of possible French reinforcements, de Córdoba lifted the siege and retreated to Castellone, some 8 kilometers south of Gaeta.

In retrospect, Cerignola marks the rise of pike and shot tactics and the beginning of 140 years of Spanish dominance on European battlefields until the defeat of Rocroi in 1643 . It is considered to be the first major battle won largely through the use of firearms, comparable to what was to occur in Japan seven decades later in the Battle of Nagashino in 1575.

References

Sources
Batista González, Juan (2007). España Estratégica. Guerra y Diplomacia en la Historia de España. Sílex. 
 Cassidy, Ben. "Machiavelli and the Ideology of the Offensive: Gunpowder Weapons in the Art of War." Journal of Military History 67#2 (2003): 381–404. online
Losada, Juan Carlos (2006). Batallas Decisivas de la Historia de España. Punto de Lectura. 
Mallet, Michael and Shaw, Christine. The Italian Wars 1494–1559. Harlow: Pearson Educated Limited (2012) .
Tafiłowski, Piotr (2007). Wojny włoskie 1494–1559. Zabrze: Inforteditions. 

1503 in Italy
Cerignola 1503
Cerignola 1503
Cerignola 1503
Cerignola
Battle
Cerignola